Hirdre-Faig or Hirdrefaig is an area in the  community of Llanddyfnan, Ynys Môn, Wales, which is 130.7 miles (210.3 km) from Cardiff and 212.3 miles (341.7 km) from London. 

According to the antiquary Thomas Nicholas in his 1872 book, the Hirdre-Faig estate was owned by a family that could trace its ancestry to Bleddyn ap Cynfyn. Their house is known to have been built in three phases, the latest of which has been dated to about 1710.

The other point of historic interest is a standing stone, which was designated an ancient monument in 2006.

References

See also
List of localities in Wales by population

Villages in Anglesey